"Work Hard, Play Hard" is a song by Dutch disc jockey and producer Tiësto with vocals from Canadian singer Kay. It was released on 10 August 2011 in the Netherlands. The electro house remix made by Canadian band Autoerotique gained more success than the original mix.

Background and release 
Tiësto declared about the song :

The song was included in a free DJ mix album, What's Next Exclusive Mix, released by Tiësto in cooperation with the flash memory brand SanDisk. The album was available on their website and its downloading gave the access to a promotion code for the brand's products.

A remix competition was organized online. Tiësto released some parts of the tracks as free on Juno Download to realise it. The winner is the Canadian band Paris FZ & Simo T who produced a progressive house remix of the song.

Music video 
A music video was realised for the Autoerotique Remix. It was directed by Loren Semmens and produced by Sean Miyashiro and Prem Kumta / Adam Hobbs of the Flavor Group. It's a gathering of Tiësto fans' videos all over the world during the Kaleidoscope World Tour, composed of 150 dates between 2009 and 2011.

Track listing 
Digital download (MF007)
 "Work Hard, Play Hard" (Original Mix) - 6:26
 "Work Hard, Play Hard" (Autoerotique Remix) - 5:11

Digital download remix contest winners
 "Work Hard, Play Hard" (Paris FZ & Simo T's Contest Winning Remix) - 5:07

Charts

References

2011 songs
2011 singles
Tiësto songs
Songs written by Tiësto